Donald Lopez may refer to: 

 Donald S. Lopez Sr. (1923–2008), American Air Force fighter and test pilot
 Donald S. Lopez Jr. (born 1952), American scholar of Buddhism